Area code 562 is a California telephone area code that was split from area code 310 on January 25, 1997. It is the area code for much of southeastern Los Angeles County, including Long Beach, and parts of northern Orange County.

History
Prior to November 2, 1991; this region had been part of area code 213.  On that date, most of the western and southern portions of the old 213 region became area code 310.  On January 25, 1997, the southern portion of the old 310 territory split again to become the 562 area code.

562 was originally meant to be an overlay code exclusively for cellular telephones and pagers for existing 310 area code customers in late 1995. However, the overlay (and all others in CA since 2008) was cancelled after cellular companies sued the California Public Utilities Commission to prevent a repeat of a similar split in New York City, where all 212 & 718 mobile customers were changed over to a new 917 NPA. Cellular technology was relatively new, and the industry argued that separate area codes for cellular customers created a stigma and would hurt sales as people wanted their home and cell phone numbers to be in the same area code. After years in court, the CPUC sided with the cellular industry, and so plans were made to split 310 instead.

Prior to October 2021, area code 562 had telephone numbers assigned for the central office code 988. In 2020, 988 was designated nationwide as a dialing code for the National Suicide Prevention Lifeline, which created a conflict for exchanges that permit seven-digit dialing. This area code was therefore scheduled to transition to ten-digit dialing by October 24, 2021.

County anomaly
One anomaly in this area code is that all of it is in Los Angeles County except for the cities of Seal Beach and Los Alamitos, which are in the very northwest corner of the Orange County coastline, portions of the city of La Habra, and the very small and northwest part of the city of Brea in the very northwest corner of inland Orange County.  These exceptions exist because, at the time of 310's creation, Pacific Bell (now part of AT&T Inc.) was the primary telephone company for most of Southern California, whereas this region's primary telephone company was GTE (later Verizon and now part of Frontier). In fact, when 310 was carved out of the southern portion of the old 213 territory, Pacific Bell chose to move all of GTE's area code 213 exchanges into the 310 area code. As the primary telephone provider in Southern California, PacBell had the right to decide what exchanges stayed in 213.

Cities and neighborhoods in the 562 area code

Los Angeles County
Artesia
Bell Gardens (also in the 213/323 area code)
Bellflower
Cerritos (small portion in the 657/714 area code)
Commerce (mostly in the 213/323 area code)
Downey
East Whittier
Hacienda Heights (mostly in the 626 area code)
Hawaiian Gardens
Industry (mostly in the 626 area code and small portion in the 840/909 area code)
La Habra Heights
La Mirada (small portion in the 657/714 area code)
Lakewood
Long Beach
Norwalk
Paramount
Pico Rivera
Rowland Heights (mostly in the 626 and 840/909 area codes)
Santa Fe Springs
Signal Hill
South Gate (mostly in the 213/323 area code and small portion in the 310/424 area code)
South Whittier
West Whittier-Los Nietos
Whittier

Orange County
Brea (mostly in the 657/714 area code)
Buena Park (mostly in the 657/714 area code)
Cypress (mostly in the 657/714 area code)
Fullerton (mostly in the 657/714 area code)
Huntington Beach (mostly in the 657/714 area code; only the Sunset Beach neighborhood is in the 562 area code)
La Habra (small portion in the 657/714 area code)
La Palma (mostly in the 657/714 area code)
Los Alamitos (small portion in the 657/714 area code)
Rossmoor
Seal Beach

See also
List of California area codes
 List of NANP area codes
 North American Numbering Plan

References

External links
North American Numbering Plan Administration
Southern California area code map

List of exchanges from AreaCodeDownload.com, 562 Area Code
Area 562 Directory

562
Los Angeles County, California
Orange County, California
Cerritos, California
Lakewood, California
Long Beach, California
Norwalk, California
Pico Rivera, California
Telecommunications-related introductions in 1997
1997 in California
562